The Suncook River is a  river located in central New Hampshire in the United States.  It is a tributary of the Merrimack River, which flows to the Gulf of Maine.

Course
The Suncook River begins at the outlet of Crystal Lake in the town of Gilmanton, New Hampshire. The village of Gilmanton Ironworks is located at the lake's outlet. The Suncook flows south two miles to the Suncook Lakes (Upper and Lower) in Barnstead. Below the lakes, the river passes through the village of Center Barnstead and enters the town of Pittsfield, whose village is centered on a 19th century dam on the river.

The river continues south through the towns of Chichester and Epsom, and then forms the town boundary between Pembroke and Allenstown.

2006 flood
On May 16, 2006, the Suncook River, responding to the highest rainfall amounts in at least 70 years (more than  dropped by a low-pressure system in three days on Concord, New Hampshire), rose to flood level and backed up behind an old mill dam, which produced a shallowly-sloping pool that overtopped a sand and gravel quarry, connected with a downstream section of channel, and cut a new shorter channel at 25–50 meters per hour in the town of Epsom. Two previous channels, around Bear Island, were left dry. The new river course, approximately a mile long, is the largest channel change in a river in New Hampshire since systematic topographic mapping began in the state in the early 20th century.

On September 3, 2018, there was news that work had begun to stabilize the Suncook River in its new course.

Artistic tributes
In 1934, the American composer Alan Hovhaness (1911–2000), who spent time with his maternal family members in Pittsfield, New Hampshire, during his youth, wrote a fantasy for cello and piano entitled Legend of the Sunkook  Valley (Op. 1, no. 4).

See also

List of rivers of New Hampshire

References

Tributaries of the Merrimack River
Rivers of New Hampshire
Rivers of Belknap County, New Hampshire
Rivers of Merrimack County, New Hampshire
Pembroke, New Hampshire
New Hampshire placenames of Native American origin